Robert Jendrusch (born 28 May 1996) is a German professional footballer who plays as a goalkeeper for 1. FC Kaan-Marienborn.

References

Living people
1996 births
German footballers
Association football goalkeepers
FC Erzgebirge Aue players
FC Ingolstadt 04 players
1. FC Kaan-Marienborn players
2. Bundesliga players
3. Liga players
Regionalliga players